The following is a list of remastering and slipstreaming software articles on Wikipedia:

Windows utilities

-*Not fully supported.

Linux utilities

See also
Comparison of disk cloning software

External links

Slipstream (computing)
Lists of software